Scanline VFX is a global visual effects and animation company founded 1989 in Munich. The studio is led by VFX Supervisor Stephan Trojansky. The company has 7 locations including Munich, Stuttgart, Los Angeles, Vancouver, Montreal, London, and Seoul.

Scanline has recently completed work on films from the Marvel Cinematic Universe (MCU) such as Spider-Man: Far From Home (2019), Black Widow, Shang-Chi and the Legend of the Ten Rings and Eternals (all 2021), and films based on DC Comics such as Zack Snyder's Justice League, The Suicide Squad (both 2021) and The Batman (2022). They have also worked on Terminator: Dark Fate, Gemini Man (both 2019), Godzilla vs. Kong, Free Guy and Don't Look Up (all 2021).

In terms of television, Scanline has worked on Game of Thrones season eight (2019), Shadow and Bone (2021-), Foundation (2021-), Cowboy Bebop (2021) and Stranger Things season four (2022).

In November 2021, Netflix announced that it would acquire Scanline. The acquisition is expected to close in the first quarter of 2022, subject to regulatory approvals and other customary closing conditions. The company will continue to operate as a standalone business and work with a variety of clients.

Accolades
Scanline is responsible for the development of its proprietary fluid effects software, Flowline. Scanline was the sole developer of Flowline and in 2008, was the recipient of a Scientific and Technical Achievement Academy Award for the software.

In 2010, Scanline was nominated for an Academy Award for Best Visual Effects for its work on Clint Eastwood's Hereafter, for which it was the sole visual effects vendor.

Scanline received a BAFTA nomination for Best Special Visual Effects in 2010 for its work on Iron Man 3 as well as a second Academy Award nomination for Best Visual Effects in 2014, for Captain America: The Winter Soldier.

In 2010, Scanline won its first Visual Effects Society Award for Outstanding Supporting Visual Effects in a Feature Motion Picture for Hereafter. Scanline has two Emmy Awards for Outstanding Special Visual Effects to its credit for its work on Season Four and Season Eight of Game of Thrones as well as an HPA Award for Outstanding Visual Effects and a Visual Effects Society Award for Outstanding Created Environment for episode The Iron Throne.

Completed projects

 300
 2012
 300: Rise of an Empire
 6 Underground
 A Good Day to Die Hard
 American Renegades
 Ant-Man and the Wasp
 Aquaman
 Batman v Superman: Dawn of Justice
 Battleship
 Ben-Hur
 Between Two Ferns: The Movie
 Bird Box
 Black Panther
 Black Widow
 Blackhat
 Bumblebee
 Captain America: The Winter Soldier
 Captain Marvel
 Charlie's Angels
 Cosmos: Possible Worlds
 Divergent
 Exodus: Gods and Kings
 Eternals
 Furious 7
 Game of Thrones
 Gemini Man
 Geostorm
 Godzilla
 Godzilla vs. Kong
 Guardians of the Galaxy Vol. 2
 Gulliver's Travels
 Hereafter
 Hotel Lux
 Immortals
 In the Fade
 In the Heart of the Sea
 Independence Day: Resurgence
 Into the Storm
 Iron Man
 Iron Man 3
 Jim Button and Luke the Engine Driver
 Joker
 Journey 2: The Mysterious Island
 Jurassic World: Fallen Kingdom
 Justice League
 King Arthur: Legend of the Sword
 Kong: Skull Island
 Looper
 Luther
 Man of Steel
 Midway
 Moonfall
 Miss Peregrine's Home for Peculiar Children
 Pan
 Pirates of the Caribbean: On Stranger Tides
 Point Break
 Pompeii
 Poseidon
 Power Rangers
 Rampage
 Rogue One: A Star Wars Story
 San Andreas
 Spider-Man: Far From Home
 Stranger Things
 Suicide Squad
 The Suicide Squad
 Shang-Chi and the Legend of the Ten Rings
 Super 8
 Terminator: Dark Fate
 The 5th Wave
 The Amazing Spider-Man
 The Apparition
 The Avengers
 The Chronicles of Narnia: Prince Caspian
 The Cut
 The First
 The Ghost Writer
 The Golden Glove
 The Goldfish
 The Hunger Games: Mockingjay - Part 1
 The Invasion
 The Last Airbender
 The Manny
 The Meg
 The Most Beautiful Day
 The Promise
 The Rescue
 The Shallows
 The Wolf of Wall Street
 Tomb Raider
 Transformers: The Last Knight
 Vicky and the Treasure of the Gods
 Vicky the Viking
 Welcome to Germany
 When Santa Fell to Earth
 White House Down
 Who Am I
 X-Men: Dark Phoenix

Filmography

2000s

2010s

2020s

Upcoming Projects

TV Series

Upcoming Projects

References

External links

German companies established in 1989
Canadian animation studios
German animation studios
Visual effects companies
Television and film post-production companies
Entertainment companies established in 1989
Companies based in Munich
Companies based in Vancouver
2022 mergers and acquisitions
Netflix